Scotoecus is a genus of bats in the family Vespertilionidae.

Species
 Scotoecus albigula - white-bellied lesser house bat
 Scotoecus albofuscus - light-winged lesser house bat
 Scotoecus hindei - Hinde's lesser house bat
 Scotoecus hirundo - dark-winged lesser house bat
 Scotoecus pallidus - desert yellow bat

References

 
Bat genera
Taxa named by Oldfield Thomas